Finsen is a lunar impact crater that is located in the southern hemisphere, on the Moon's far side. It is attached to the southeastern exterior of the walled plain Leibnitz, and the ejecta from Finsen covers the southeastern part of Leibnitz's interior floor. To the southwest of Finsen is another walled plain, Von Kármán, partly overlain by Leibnitz.

This is a relatively young impact crater with well-defined features that have not been significantly eroded by subsequent impacts. The rim is circular but somewhat uneven along the edge, with outward protrusions along all sides except to the north and northwest. The inner wall has slumped in places, producing a sharp rim edge in the southern half. There are also a number of short terraces along the inner wall.

The inner wall is wider to the north, and so the relatively level interior floor is offset slightly to the south. At the midpoint of the crater is a central peak formation, occupying an area of roughly 15 km. This central peak has a higher albedo than the surrounding floor or rim, giving a lightened appearance. There are no significant impacts along the crater rim or within the interior.

Satellite craters
By convention these features are identified on lunar maps by placing the letter on the side of the crater midpoint that is closest to Finsen.

References

 
 
 
 
 
 
 
 
 
 
 
 

Impact craters on the Moon